Erie station is a subway station in Philadelphia, Pennsylvania, served by the SEPTA Broad Street Line. It is located in North Philadelphia under the intersection of 3700 North Broad Street and Erie Avenue.

Since Erie is an express station, it has four tracks and two central platforms, with express and Ridge Spur trains operating on the inner tracks and local trains operating on the outer tracks.  This station has two mezzanine levels located above the track level.  One is an entrance/exit mezzanine which holds turnstiles and the payment booth, while the other is exit-only. The station is located near the former Luzerne Depot, a former trolley barn which became an all bus garage, and is now a cardboard recycling plant.

As of 2007, Erie station had approximately 6,842 boardings a day, making it the fourth busiest station on the line.

There is a flying junction north of Erie Station; originally built for the Roosevelt Boulevard Subway, it served as the northbound terminus for the Broad-Ridge Spur until service was extended to Fern Rock.

Station layout

Gallery

References

External links 

SEPTA Broad Street Line stations
Railway stations in the United States opened in 1928
Railway stations in Philadelphia
Railway stations located underground in Pennsylvania